A pedant is a person who is excessively concerned with formalism, accuracy and precision, or one who makes an ostentatious and arrogant show of learning.

Etymology

The English language word pedant comes from the French pédant (used in 1566 in Darme & Hatzfeldster's Dictionnaire général de la langue française) or its older mid-15th century Italian source pedante, 'teacher, schoolmaster'. (Compare the Spanish pedante.) The origin of the Italian pedante is uncertain, but several dictionaries suggest that it was contracted from the medieval Latin pædagogans, present participle of pædagogare, 'to act as pedagogue, to teach' (Du Cange) (see pedagogy). The Latin word is derived from Greek , paidagōgós,  'child' +  'to lead', which originally referred to a slave who escorted children to and from school but later meant "a source of instruction or guidance".

Medical conditions 
Obsessive–compulsive personality disorder (OCPD) is in part characterized by a form of pedantry that is excessively concerned with the correct following of rules, procedures, and practices. Sometimes the rules that OCPD sufferers obsessively follow are of their own devising, or are corruptions or reinterpretations of the letter of actual rules.

Pedantry can also be an indication of specific developmental disorders. In particular, people with Autism Spectrum Disorder (formerly Asperger syndrome) often have behaviour characterized by pedantic speech.

See also 

 Perfectionism (psychology)

References 

Human behavior
Pejorative terms for people